David Michael Williams (born 11 March 1955) is a former Welsh international footballer who played as a midfielder.

Playing career

Bristol Rovers
Williams started off in amateur football with Clifton Athletic before joining Bristol Rovers in 1975. Unusually, he began with the League club as an amateur, combining playing League football with studying on a teacher training course, and later with teaching at Mostyn High School in Cardiff. After already making 113 League appearances, he finally turned fully professional in 1978.

In May 1983, he was promoted to the position of player-manager after Bobby Gould left. He won 51 of his 108 games in the post, and won the Gloucestershire Cup twice.

Norwich City
He was still player-manager of Rovers when Norwich City manager Ken Brown took him to Carrow Road before the start of the 1985–86 season. Williams won a second division championship medal in his first season with the Canaries and went on to serve the club as player-coach, assistant manager and, for one game, caretaker manager before he left in 1992.

Welsh international
It was during his time with Norwich in Division 1 that he played five times for Wales. In 1988, he also coached the Wales national football team as caretaker manager, including a 1−3 loss against Yugoslavia, prior to the appointment of Terry Yorath.

Management and coaching
In July 1992 Williams was appointed assistant manager at AFC Bournemouth. In February 1994 he took on the same position at Everton before becoming reserve team coach at Leeds United. After completing a youth team coaching role at Manchester United in 2002, he spent some time as a driving instructor in Harrogate, returning to Norwich to as Assistant Academy Manager in the summer of 2004.

In addition to his role at Carrow Road, he also coached the Welsh international youth sides as assistant to Brian Flynn. In May 2007 at the age of 52 Williams left Norwich and retired from club coaching though continued his involvement with the Welsh youth squads. He briefly became assistant manager of the Welsh team when Flynn was appointed caretaker in September 2010.

In February 2013, soon after Flynn had been made manager of Doncaster Rovers, he appointed Williams as his assistant. Williams left the role at the end of the 2012/13 season.

Honours
Norwich City
 Football League Second Division (Level 2) Champions: 1985–86

Williams was voted into the Norwich City F.C. Hall of Fame in 2002 in recognition of his contribution to the club as a player and a coach.

References

Canary Citizens by Mike Davage, John Eastwood, Kevin Platt, published by Jarrold Publishing, (2001),

External links
Career information at ex-canaries.co.uk

1955 births
Living people
Welsh footballers
Association football midfielders
Bristol Rovers F.C. players
Bristol Rovers F.C. managers
Footballers from Cardiff
Norwich City F.C. players
AFC Bournemouth non-playing staff
Everton F.C. non-playing staff
Manchester United F.C. non-playing staff
Leeds United F.C. non-playing staff
Welsh football managers
Wales international footballers
Wales under-23 international footballers
Wales national football team managers
English Football League players
Norwich City F.C. non-playing staff
Doncaster Rovers F.C. non-playing staff